Fresvillia is an extinct cephalopod genus belonging to baculitid family of the ammonoid order Ancyloceratida that lived during the Late Cretaceous, found in France. Baculitids are a kind of heteromorph ammonite characterized by a straight adult shaft, often preceded by a small coiled juvenile portion.

Baculites, Boehmoceras, Eubaculites, and Lechites, are among related genera.

References
 Fresvillia-Paleodb

Ammonitida genera
Turrilitoidea
Late Cretaceous ammonites
Fossils of France